Douglas Joseph Steinhardt (born November 6, 1968) is an American attorney and politician from New Jersey who is the State Senator for New Jersey's 23rd legislative district, since being sworn into office on December 19, 2022. He previously served as the Chairman of the New Jersey Republican State Committee from 2017 to 2020.

Early life and career 
Steinhardt was born in Belvidere, New Jersey and received his undergraduate degree in history from the Gettysburg College.  He was also a four-year member of the Gettysburg NCAA Division III football team. After completing his undergraduate studies he enrolled in Widener University Commonwealth Law School where he earned his J.D.  During law school he served as the associate editor of the Law Review.

After law school Steinhardt returned to New Jersey to begin his law career in his father's law office in Belvidere, New Jersey. In 2005 he helped form the Law Firm of Florio Perrucci Steinhardt & Fader, LLC, by becoming the third named partner in the law firm that is headed by former New Jersey Governor James Florio.

In 2015, Steinhardt was inducted into the Warren County, New Jersey Hall of Fame, joining his mother Therese, a nurse and nurse educator, who was inducted in 2013.

Municipal politics 
In his first run for public office, Steinhardt was elected Mayor of Lopatcong Township in 1999, beating Democratic incumbent William Baker by twelve votes. He ran on controlling development, and challenged Baker to debates, which Baker declined to participate in. In his reelection campaign in 2002, he again defeated Baker, this time with 80% of the vote.  He ran and won with no opposition for the next three elections. He declined to run for a sixth term in 2014 and was succeeded by Tom McKay.

Steinhardt was elected Chairman of the Warren County Republican Committee on January 31, 2004 to fill the unexpired term of the outgoing chair who resigned to focus on private sector opportunities.  He ran on the idea of promoting inclusion among Republican committee members, some of whom often complained about a lack of communications within the county committee.  He defeated his opponent by a 2-1 margin among elected members of the committee According to  the Express Times his leadership style and ability to bring various factions of the party together made it so that he ran unopposed for a full term six months later.

After his first election as the county committee chair, Steinhardt ran unopposed and won every two years, except for 2012. In that year, Steinhardt faced opposition because he had lost his Lopatcong committee seat, though only by five votes. Steinhardt defeated a committeeperson from Greenwich Township who challenged his position in a 92–35 vote.

State chairman and gubernatorial run 
He was initially nominated by Lieutenant Governor Kim Guadagno and Republican Primary nominee to be the Chairman of the New Jersey State Republican Committee in June 2017 but a last minute appointment by the then Governor of his wife to a position with the parole board caused concern for the Lt. Governor.  Steinhardt withdrew his candidacy and was replaced by Michael B. Lavery.  Six months later in November 2017, after the Democratic victory in the ensuing gubernatorial election, Lavery resigned and Steinhardt was named Chairman.

Steinhardt resigned as Chairman in December 2020 and launched a bid for Governor of New Jersey in the Republican primary. He positioned himself as a staunch supporter of outgoing President Donald Trump. However, he withdrew from the race on January 11, 2021, shortly after the storming of the U.S. Capitol by Trump supporters.

State senate run 
In September 2022, following the announcement that longtime State Senator Michael J. Doherty would retire to seek the Warren County Surrogate’s Office, Steinhardt announced that he would run in a special election convention for Doherty’s vacated senate seat representing the 23rd legislative district.

Steinhardt was elected to the seat unopposed on December 10, 2022 at a special convention. He was sworn into office on December 19, 2022.

Charitable and non-profit causes
As a youth, Steinhardt earned the Eagle Scout award. He was on the Board of Directors of the Central New Jersey Council of the Boy Scouts of America as of 2011.
In January 2017 Steinhardt co-founded and co-chairs the Warren County Addiction Awareness Task Force to address the spiraling heroin and opioid epidemics.

References

|-

1968 births
Candidates in the 2021 United States elections
Chairmen of the New Jersey Republican State Committee
Gettysburg College alumni
Living people
Mayors of places in New Jersey
New Jersey Republicans
People from Belvidere, New Jersey
People from Lopatcong Township, New Jersey
Republican Party New Jersey state senators
Widener University Commonwealth Law School alumni